The Great Emperor of the Curved Array, also called the Gouchen Emperor and Tianhuang Emperor, is one of the highest sky deities of Taoism. He is one of the Four Sovereigns and is in charge of heaven, earth, and human and of wars in the human world.

Chinese mythology 
The "Curved Array" is a constellation in the Purple Forbidden enclosure, equivalent to the European constellation called Ursa Minor or the Little Dipper. In Taoism, the Great Emperor of Curved Array is the eldest son of Doumu and the brother of the Ziwei Emperor.

History 
Emperor Gaozong of Tang was called by the title Emperor Tianhuang as his Posthumous name given by Wu Zetian. Liu Yan was also given the posthumous name.

Constellation 

There is a constellation named after the Tianhuang Emperor.

See also 
 North Star
 Myōken
 Wufang Shangdi
 Four heavenly ministers

Notes

References

External links 
 道教文化资料库 
 玉皇大帝 
 后土皇地祇－地母元君 

Deities in Taoism
Chinese gods
Four heavenly ministers
Chinese constellations
Stellar deities
Polaris